The Super Sunday phone-a-thon is an annual fundraising event held by many of the 155 Jewish federations located in North America.  The phone-a-thons are typically expected to raise most of the budget for the federation and its constituent agencies and organizations.

The name "Super Sunday" is borrowed from the American football usage for the day on which the Super Bowl is played.  Impliedly, the Super Sunday phone-a-thon is also the major annual event for the federation, as Super Sundays play a large role in the life of the local Jewish community.  The results of a Super Sunday can have a major impact on the contribution intake of any particular federation, and thus can have a domino effect on the various entities that receive federation funding, such as social service organization, classes, scholarships, and family care.

Some of the largest and most visible Super Sundays occur in the major urban areas with large Jewish concentrations, such as Los Angeles and New York, but also through smaller federations, such as Seattle and Minneapolis. Super Sunday was created by Jerry Dick of the Jewish Federation of Greater Washington in 1980.

External links
 Super Sunday - Jewish Community Federation of San Francisco, the Peninsula, Marin and Sonoma Counties
 Super Sunday - UJA Federation of Northern New Jersey
 Super Sunday - Jewish Federation of Metropolitan Detroit
 Super Sunday website at the Jewish Federation of Greater Washington

Jewish community organizations
Jewish Federations of North America